Power Rangers Wild Force is a television series and the tenth season of Power Rangers. It is also the anniversary season of the Power Rangers franchise, based on the 25th Super Sentai series Hyakujuu Sentai Gaoranger, which itself was the 25th anniversary of Super Sentai.

Power Rangers Wild Force is the first season to be produced by Disney, following the sale of Fox Family Worldwide (renamed ABC Family Worldwide) including Saban Entertainment (renamed BVS Entertainment) to Disney by Haim Saban and News Corporation, Fox's parent company. The first part of the series was originally broadcast from February to August 2002 on the Fox Kids television block. The show was moved in the fall 2002 to ABC's new Saturday morning block, ABC Kids (formerly Disney's One Saturday Morning).

Plot
The series follows the adventure of Cole Evans, who had been staying with a tribe in a jungle for many years, as he tries to find his destiny in the town of Turtle Cove. He encounters the Animarium, an island shaped like a turtle floating in the sky, which many believed to exist only in fairy tales, and is the home of the Wild Zords, and the Rangers' mentor, Princess Shayla. He joins four other Rangers, Taylor Earhardt, Max Cooper, Alyssa Enrile, and Danny Delgado, becoming the new leader of the Wild Force Power Rangers.

The Power Rangers use their powers to defeat the forces of the Orgs,monsters created from human pollution, led by one Master Org. As Cole was fond of other animals, he was shocked to discover that the Orgs were literally heartless horned monsters. As the series continues, he finds out the truth about his real parents, Richard and Elizabeth Evans, who were professors at Turtle Cove University, along with a family friend, Dr. Viktor Adler, who was secretly in love with Elizabeth. When they were sent to the jungle for research, they discover the remains of Master Org, in which a jealous Adler consumes in order to exact revenge on Richard, who had proposed to Elizabeth before he could. However, Adler goes insane, and kills both Richard and Elizabeth. For a while, their newborn son, Cole, was also presumed dead.

In an attempt to defeat the rangers, Master Org releases Zen-Aku, a wolf duke-org who sealed away by the ancient warriors, the predecessors of the Wild Force Rangers, 3000 years ago. Zen-Aku,however is soon to be revealed as Merrick Baliton, a member of ancient warriors who defeated the original Master Org by using the powers of cursed wolf mask. The rangers break the curse, returning Merrick to his human form, allowing him to join the team as the Lunar Wolf Ranger. Zen-Aku is later revealed to have been freed from the curse and attempts to repossess Merrick, but is defeated.

During the annual team-up episode, a trio of powerful half-mutant, half-org monsters called Mut-Orgs travel back in time from the year 3001 to join forces with Master Org and clash with Wes Collins and Eric Myers, the Red Time Force Ranger and Quantum Ranger, prompting the Wild Force Rangers to come to their aid. Wes and Eric contact the other four Time Force rangers in the future and they travel back to aid them, along the previous season's villains Ransik and his daughter Nadira. Ransik, who has reformed, reveals that he was the one who freed the Mut-Orgs and works with the rangers, stripping the three monster mutant powers and weakening them enough for the rangers to destroy them. Ransik is also stripped of his own powers during the battle, turning him into a normal human.

Eventually Duke Orgs Jindrax and Toxica learn of Master Org's human origins and turn on him, awakening the Org General Mandilok to overthrow him.Shortly after during a battle with the rangers Master Org is stripped of his powers. Mandilok takes this opportunity to kill the now powerless Dr.Adler. Mandilok then proceeds to take control of the Org forces. Meanwhile the ranger befriend an amnesiac boy named Kite who has mysterious powers. Kite is revealed to the reborn Animus, the ancestor of the Wild Zords who was destroyed by the original Master Org 3000 years ago. Mandilok attempts to turn Animus against the rangers by showing him the destruction and pollution humans have caused over the last 3000 years, and appears to be successful as Animus takes away the Ranger's Wild Zords. However Animus revealed he was only testing the rangers and returns to aid them and gives them back their Wild Zords.

Soon after the original Master Org, reawakened and reborn in Dr.Adler's body after his death, returns to exact his revenge, destroying Mandilok and kidnapping Princess Shayla to use her powerful necklace to create the powerful Org Heart. Though the Rangers rescue the princess with the aid of Jindrax and Toxica, Master Org uses the Org Heart to transform into a powerful new form that can regenerate from any attack. Using his new powers, Master Org easily destroys all the rangers' Zords, stripping the rangers of their powers, and brings the Animarium crashing down to Earth. The rangers, though now powerless, refuse to give up and make a final stand against Master Org, this cause not only the Wild Zords that Master Org destroyed to be revived, but for the 77 other lost Wilds Zords to return and restoring the rangers' powers. The rangers together with all 100 Wild Zords destroy Master Org and the Org Heart, ending the threat of the Orgs once and for all.

With the threat over, Princess Shayla allows the rangers to return to their civilian lives, taking the Wild Zords and the Animarium back up into the sky until they're needed again. Cole travels the world, using his skills to help animals everywhere,Taylor returns to the Air Force,Max and Danny travel the world on a sight-seeing tour, Merrick travels the world as well, accompanied by a now reformed Zen-Aku, and Alyssa finishes college and becomes a teacher. The series ends with Alyssa telling her story to a kindergarten class, revealing she was the narrator of the series.

In addition to the annual team-up episodes, Power Rangers Wild Force also had a special episode commemorating it as the tenth incarnation, Forever Red, by having Cole team up with the nine Red Rangers before him (Jason Lee Scott, Aurico, Tommy Oliver, T.J. Johnson, Andros, Leo Corbett, Carter Grayson, Wes Collins and Eric Myers) to prevent the remaining generals of the Machine Empire from unearthing and reactivating Lord Zedd's Zord, Serpentera, which had been left buried on the moon.

The Animarium reappeared during Power Rangers Super Megaforce in "A Lion's Alliance".

Cast and characters
Wild Force Rangers
Ricardo Medina Jr. as Cole Evans, the Red Wild Force Ranger.
Alyson Kiperman as Taylor Earhardt, the Yellow Wild Force Ranger.
Phillip Jeanmarie as Max Cooper, the Blue Wild Force Ranger.
Jack Guzman as Danny Delgado, the Black Wild Force Ranger.
Jessica Rey as Alyssa Enrilé, the White Wild Force Ranger.
Phillip Andrew as Merrick Baliton, the Lunar Wolf Ranger.

Supporting characters
Ann Marie Crouch as Princess Shayla
Charles Gideon Davis as the voice of Animus
Brianne Siddall as the voice of Circuit
J.D. Hall as Willie

Villains
Ilia Volok as Ancient/Original and Reincarnated Master Org/Dr. Viktor Adler
Sin Wong as Toxica
Richard Cansino as the voice of Jindrax (original)   
Danny Wayne as the voice of Jindrax (later)
Michael Sorich as the voice of Retinax
Ken Merckx as the voice of Nayzor
Ezra Weisz and Barbara Goodson as the voices of Mandilok
Dan Woren as the voice of Zen-Aku (original) & Onikage
Lex Lang as the voice of Zen-Aku (later)

Guest stars
Time Force Rangers
Jason Faunt as Wesley "Wes" Collins, the Red Time Force Ranger.
Erin Cahill as Jennifer "Jen" Scotts, the Pink Time Force Ranger.
Kevin Kleinberg as Trip, the Green Time Force Ranger.
Deborah Estelle Philips as Katie Walker, the Yellow Time Force Ranger.
Michael Copon as Lucas Kendall, the Blue Time Force Ranger.
Daniel Southworth as Eric Myers, the Quantum Ranger.
Forever Red Rangers
Austin St. John as Jason Lee Scott, the original Red Ranger, and previously the second Gold Zeo Ranger.
Christopher Glenn as Aurico, the Red Aquitian Ranger.
Jason David Frank as Tommy Oliver, the Zeo Ranger V Red and previously the Green Ranger, White Ranger, and the first Red Turbo Ranger.
Selwyn Ward as T.J. Johnson, the second Red Turbo Ranger, and previously the Blue Space Ranger.
Christopher Khayman Lee as Andros, the Red Space Ranger.
Danny Slavin as Leo Corbett, the Red Galaxy Ranger.
Sean Cw Johnson as Carter Grayson, the Red Lightspeed Ranger.
Richard Steven Horvitz as the voice of Alpha 7
Vernon Wells as Ransik
Kate Sheldon as Nadira
Archie Kao as the voice of General Venjix
Walter Jones as the voice of Gerrok
Catherine Sutherland as the voice of Tezzla
Scott Page-Pagter as the voice of Steelon
David Walsh as the voice of Automon
David Lodge as the voice of Takach & Kired
Kim Strauss as the voice of Rofang

Episodes

Notes

References

External links

 

 
Wild Force
Television series by Saban Entertainment
Fox Broadcasting Company original programming
2000s American science fiction television series
2002 American television series debuts
2002 American television series endings
American Broadcasting Company original programming
English-language television shows
Television series about animals
Television series about orphans
Television series by Disney
Television shows filmed in Los Angeles
Television shows filmed in Santa Clarita, California
Television shows set in California
Television series about size change
American children's action television series
American children's adventure television series
American children's fantasy television series
Television series created by Haim Saban